Curry ketchup, also called Currygewürzketchup (lit. "curry spice ketchup") in Germany, is a spiced variant of ketchup and a common sauce in Belgium, Germany, Denmark and the Netherlands.

It is typically served on prepared meats such as frikandel, or on French fries. In Germany, it is the basis of the dish currywurst, one of the most popular in the country. Typically with currywurst, additional curry powder is sprinkled on top of the curry ketchup.

Major brands producing curry ketchup include Zeisner, Heinz, Hela, Oliehoorn, and Knorr.

References

Curry
Ketchup